Gladbach may refer to:

the former name of Mönchengladbach, a city in North Rhine-Westphalia, Germany
Borussia Mönchengladbach, a football club in Mönchengladbach
the former name of Bergisch Gladbach, a city in North Rhine-Westphalia, Germany
Gladbach, Rhineland-Palatinate, a municipality in the district Bernkastel-Wittlich, Rhineland-Palatinate, Germany
Gladbach, a suburban administrative district of Neuwied, Rhineland-Palatinate, Germany
Gladbach (Niers), a river of North Rhine-Westphalia, Germany
Gladbach Formation, a geologic formation in Germany